Players marked in bold have been capped at full International level.

Group A

Bulgaria 
Coach:  Antoni Zdravkov

France
Coach:  Patrick Gonfalone

Czech Republic
Coach:  Pavel Hoftych

Mexico
Coach:   Raúl Gutiérrez

Mali
Coach:  Fousseni Diawara

Group B

England
Coach:  Gareth Southgate
Brendan Galloway was ruled out of the England squad after he was injured in training; he was replaced by Rob Holding.

Guinea
Head coach:  Koly Koivogui

Japan
Head coach:  Makoto Teguramori

Paraguay
Head coach:  Carlos Humberto Paredes

Portugal
Head coach:  Edgar Álvaro Borges

References

Toulon Tournament squads
Squads